This is a list of Chico State Wildcats football players in the NFL Draft.

Key

Selections

References

Cal Poly

Chico State Wildcats in the NFL Draft
Chico State Wildcats NFL Draft